The San Giovanni Rotondo Formation is an Early Cretaceous (Hauterivian to Barremian) geologic formation in Italy. Fossil ornithopod tracks have been reported from the formation.

Fossil content 
The following fossils have been reported from the formation:
Ichnofossils
 Ornithischia indet.
 Theropoda indet.

See also 
 List of dinosaur-bearing rock formations
 List of stratigraphic units with ornithischian tracks
 Ornithopod tracks
 List of fossiliferous stratigraphic units in Italy
 Calcare di Altamura
 Calcare di Bari

References

Bibliography 
  
 P. Gianolla, M. D. Morsilli, F. M. Dalla Vecchia, A. Borsellini, and A. Russo. 2000. Impronte di dinosauri nel Cretaceo inferiore del Gargano (Puglia, Italia Meridionale): nuove implicazioni paleogeografiche [Dinosaur footprints from the Lower Cretaceous of Gargano (Puglia, southern Italy): new paleogeographic implications]. In G. B. Carulli & G. Longo Salvador (ed.), 80° Riunione Estiva, Società Geologica Italiana, Riassunti delle comunicazioni orali e dei posters 265-266

Geologic formations of Italy
Lower Cretaceous Series of Europe
Cretaceous Italy
Barremian Stage
Hauterivian Stage
Limestone formations
Shale formations
Reef deposits
Ichnofossiliferous formations
Paleontology in Italy
Formations